José Domingo de la Merced de la Mar y Cortázar (May 12, 1778 – October 11, 1830) was a Peruvian military leader and politician who served as the third President of Peru.

Biography

Youth
De la Mar was born in Cuenca in what today is Ecuador. The son of Marcos de la Mar y Migura (1736-1794) and his wife Josefa Paula Cortázar y Lavayen (1748-1815), he spent his early childhood in Spain.

Military career in Spain, France and Peru (1794-1820)
With the help of his influential uncle, de la Mar entered the Spanish army as a sub-lieutenant of the regiment of Savoy. In 1794 he participated in the campaign of Roussillon against the French Republic, fighting under the command of Count of Conquest, after which he was promoted to captain ( 1795 ). Then participated in various military actions against revolutionary France, and was already a lieutenant colonel in the time of Spain's national war against Napoleon's invasion ( 1808 ). He participated in the defense of Zaragoza next to the Colonel Palafox ( 1808 - 1809 ). Was seriously injured, and although that city finally capitulated, earned the title of "Hero of the nation in a heroic" and promotion to colonel .

In 1812 he transferred to the front of Valencia, led by General Joaquín Blake, and sent a column of 4,000 veterans grenadiers (the "column The Sea"). Again he was wounded, and was taken to hospital in Tudela, where he was captured by the French. No sooner was recovered was taken to France and confined in the castle of Saumur ( Burgundy ), where he studied the classics of French culture. After a time managed to escape, accompanied by Brigadier Juan María Muñoz and Manito, crossed Switzerland and the Tyrol and reached the port of Trieste, on the Adriatic Sea, where he sailed back to Spain.

In 1815, Ferdinand VII promoted him to Brigadier, awarded him the Saint Hermenegildo's Cross and appointed him Sub-Inspector of the Viceroyalty of Peru, with the title of Governor of Callao. He arrived at the city in 1816. In 1819, he was promoted to field marshal.

The War of Independence (1821–1827)
The Royalist Cause
During the early days of the Peruvian War of Independence, he joined forces with the Royalists, taking care of the Real Felipe Fortress, in the main port of the Viceroyalty, Callao. Viceroy José de la Serna abandoned the capital on June 6, 1821, leaving him with explicit orders to resist and wait for reinforcements. He successfully stopped all attempts to capture the fort for nearly 4 months, until the arrival of General José Canterac and a powerful division sent by Viceroy de la Serna gave him the orders to surrender the fort due to the lack of supplies and troops. On September 19, the garrison surrendered, in the Baquijano Capitulation, only two days after de la Mar finally submitted his left foot to amputation, having initially refused treatment of a gangrenous toe.

The Rebel Cause

After the Baquijano Capitulation, de la Mar joined forces with the rebel cause. José de San Martín awarded him with the title of "Division General", a title he accepted reluctantly.

De la Mar served as one of three men on the Supreme Governing Board of the Republic of Peru from September 22, 1822 to February 27, 1823. He served as the President of the Congress from November 1823 to December 1823.

De la Mar served as the Constitutional President of the Republic of Peru from August 22, 1827 to June 7, 1829. He was removed from the Presidency of Peru after less than two years by a coup d'état led by General Agustín Gamarra and died in forced exile in Costa Rica.

References 

People from Cuenca, Ecuador
Presidents of Peru
Presidents of the Congress of the Republic of Peru
1778 births
1830 deaths
History of Peru
People of the Peruvian War of Independence
Marshals of Peru
Freemasons